Najwa Kassem (romanized as Qasem, Qassim, and Kassem; 7 July 1967 – 2 January 2020) was a Lebanese journalist and television presenter (anchor) for Al Jadeed, Future TV and Al Arabiya.

Kassem has received many professional awards, and she was named by Arabian Business Magazine as one of the 100 most powerful women in the Arab world.

Personal 
Najwa Qassem was born on 7 July 1967 in Joun, Lebanon, a few years before the Lebanese Civil War. Qassem initially aspired to study architecture but soon fell in love with media and televised broadcasting.

Career 
She first appeared on television in 1991 on Al Jadeed (New TV Lebanon) as a program presenter, then in 1993 moved to Future TV of Beirut. In 2003 she became a part of the team for Al Arabiya. Since 2003 Qassem has been a senior anchor and correspondent of the Al Arabiya news channel. She has covered numerous wars and assassinations during her career including the assassination of Rafic Hariri in 2005, and is considered a veteran news reporter.

Throughout her years of experience she has put herself in the front lines of danger, and has covered some of the dangerous events going on in the world: The War on Afghanistan, Israel Occupations and Subsequent Withdrawals in South Lebanon.

A year after joining the Al Arabiya team, she experienced and survived a bombing attack on the Al Arabiya's Baghdad news station. Eight people died in the bombing.

Najwa Qassem reported updates on the Iraqi war from the front lines in Baghdad. During her last week in Baghdad, the capital of Iraq, restrictions were placed on journalists making it dangerous to move around.

Najwa Qassem received extensive coverage during the Israeli war on Lebanon as she was one of a number of female Arab reporters who were reporting from the front lines. Qassem and her colleague Rima Maktabi observed the bombing of a heavily populated region of south Lebanon being attacked from the air as well as the sea.

Awards
Najwa Qassem was awarded Best Female Presenter in 2006 at the Fourth Arab Media Festival.

Death
On 2 January 2020, Qassem died in her sleep from a heart attack, although having had no prior health problems.

See also 
 Atwar Bahjat
 Rima Maktabi

References

Further reading 
 

1967 births
2020 deaths
People from Chouf District
Al Arabiya people
Lebanese journalists
Lebanese television presenters
Lebanese women journalists
Lebanese expatriates in the United Arab Emirates
Lebanese women television presenters
Lebanese Shia Muslims
Lebanese University alumni